Živorad "Žika" Mitrović (3 September 1921 – 29 January 2005) was a Serbian and Yugoslav film director and screenwriter. He started his career as a comics artist. Mitrovic directed 20 feature films between 1955 and 1986. His 1974 film The Republic of Užice was entered into the 9th Moscow International Film Festival where it won a Diploma.

Filmography

References

External links

1921 births
2005 deaths
Film people from Belgrade
Serbian film directors
Golden Arena for Best Director winners
Serbian screenwriters
Male screenwriters
Yugoslav film directors
20th-century screenwriters